is a Japanese television drama series based on the South Korean webtoon Misaeng and TV series Misaeng.

The drama premiered on Fuji Television on July 17, 2016.

References

External links
 

Japanese drama television series
2015 Japanese television series debuts
Fuji TV dramas
Japanese television series based on South Korean television series
Television shows based on South Korean webtoons